Risto Luukkonen (31 July 1931 – 12 August 1967) was a Finnish boxer. He competed in the men's flyweight event at the 1952 Summer Olympics. As a professional, he was the EBU's flyweight champion after defeating Spain's Young Martin by a 15 rounds decision on 4 September 1959.

References

External links
 

1931 births
1967 deaths
Finnish male boxers
Olympic boxers of Finland
Boxers at the 1952 Summer Olympics
People from Tuusula
Flyweight boxers
Sportspeople from Uusimaa